The 1972 Nebraska Cornhuskers football team represented the University of Nebraska in the 1972 NCAA University Division football season.  The team was coached by Bob Devaney, in his eleventh and final season with the Huskers, and played their home games in Memorial Stadium in Lincoln.

Nebraska, national champions in 1970 and 1971, entered the season top-ranked in the polls, with a 23-game winning streak and a 32-game unbeaten streak.

Schedule

Source:

Roster

Coaching staff

Game summaries

UCLA

Unranked UCLA, sporting their new wishbone offense led by junior college transfer Mark Harmon, handed #1 Nebraska its first loss in 33 games, and broke Nebraska's 23-game winning streak, both at that time active NCAA records. The Cornhuskers were upset in Los Angeles after suffering four fumbles and giving up two interceptions, though the game was not decided until UCLA's Efren Herrera kicked a field goal to break the tie with just 22 seconds remaining. The upset loss dropped Nebraska from first to tenth in the AP Poll rankings.

Texas A&M

    
    
    
    
    
    
    

Due to a stadium expansion completed over the summer, Nebraska's home opener drew record attendance with slightly more than 76,000 spectators. Nebraska recovered from the loss to UCLA with a dominant 37–7 victory over Texas A&M, whose sole touchdown came late in the 4th quarter against Cornhusker reserves.

Army

Nebraska entirely stomped Army, with the Cornhusker reserves taking over in the 3rd quarter behind a very comfortable lead, and the Black Knights' lone score to prevent the shutout came on a 10-yard pass reception with just 35 seconds left to play.

Minnesota

For the third straight week, Nebraska dominated the game in every way, shutting out Minnesota while piling up 542 yards of offense.

Missouri

Nebraska was not affected by the week off, and thoroughly pounded Missouri 62-0.  Although the scoreboard and statistics might suggest Missouri was out of their league against Nebraska, the Tigers went on after this painful shutout to upset Notre Dame and Colorado in their next two games.

Kansas

The shutouts and domination continued, as Nebraska scored at will against Kansas in Lawrence, and held the Jayhawks to just 63 total yards of offense and only 4 1st downs.

Oklahoma State

Nebraska tied a 1937 NCAA record of 4 straight shutouts, and although Oklahoma State was not as easy to push around as the previous three opponents, the Cornhuskers still had little trouble getting the win.

Colorado

Colorado attempted to put some more challenge into the event than Nebraska had been seeing in recent games, and was even able to draw back from a 0-19 deficit to get within 9 by halftime and end Nebraska's shutout streak, but it was all Cornhusker points the rest of the way.  Still, the Blackshirts mourned the end of their touchdown-free stretch at 17 quarters.

Iowa State

Iowa State pretty much ended any Nebraska hopes for another national title, as the Cornhuskers gave up two interceptions and six fumbles to help the Cyclones stay in the game.  Nebraska came back from behind to pull ahead 20-17 in the 4th, and padded the lead with a field goal when the clock was down to just 1:03, but Iowa State stormed back down the field to score again with 0:23 remaining, and would have won the game outright if the subsequent PAT had not failed and ended the game tied at 23.

Kansas State

Nebraska put up Coach Devaney's 100th career win as the Cornhuskers easily trampled Kansas State in Lincoln and had reserves in the game for playing time while cruising behind a comfortable 38-0 lead even prior to the half.  The Wildcats finally put up a touchdown with just over 6 minutes remaining to play.

Oklahoma

It looked like Nebraska's day on Thanksgiving in Devaney's final home game as head coach. They led at the half and were up  in the 3rd, but underdog Oklahoma scored seventeen unanswered points for  Nebraska's three-year home winning streak, which began in September 1969, ended at

Notre Dame

Heisman Trophy winner Johnny Rodgers was shifted from WB to IB for the 1973 Orange Bowl, and flashed brilliance as he ran for three touchdowns, caught a touchdown pass, and also threw a fifth touchdown.  The Cornhuskers scored with ease and often against the stunned Fighting Irish, who were unable to put any points up of their own until the 4th quarter.  This was head coach Bob Devaney's final game, a third straight Orange Bowl victory, and second straight Orange Bowl rout.

Rankings

Awards

1972 Team Players in the NFL

The 1972 Nebraska Cornhuskers seniors selected in the 1973 NFL Draft:

The 1972 Nebraska Cornhuskers juniors selected in the following year's 1974 NFL Draft:

The 1972 Nebraska Cornhuskers sophomores selected in the 1975 NFL Draft:

NFL and Pro Players
The following is a list of 1972 Nebraska playerswho joined a professional team as draftees or free agents.

References

Nebraska
Nebraska Cornhuskers football seasons
Big Eight Conference football champion seasons
Orange Bowl champion seasons
Nebraska Cornhuskers football